Dulari is a 1949 Indian Hindi-language romantic musical film directed by A.R. Kardar. The film stars Madhubala, Geeta Bali and Suresh, and its music was composed by Naushad. Dulari revolved around Prem (Suresh), a rich man who falls in love with the eponymous gypsy girl (Madhubala).

Although not well-received by critics, the film became a major commercial success on its release. It was also continuously shown in theaters for over 35 weeks and subsequently emerged as a silver jubilee hit. The film's success played an important role in the career developments of Madhubala, Bali and Naushad.

Plot 
Prem Shankar (Suresh) is the son of a rich businessman whose parents want him to marry into a rich family. However, he loves a gypsy girl named Dulari (Madhubala) (who was kidnapped by gypsies in her childhood), but her father orders him not to marry her. Prem, however, disagrees and leaves the house to marry Dulari. He brings Dulari to his other house to marry. The gypsy sardar's son also wants to marry her and kidnaps her. He also loots Dulari's real father and ties him at his backyard. Another gypsy woman Kasturi (Geeta Bali) gets to know Dulari's truth and frees her father. Prem, after fighting, frees Dulari again. His mother brings both back home, but his father refuses to bless them. Another gypsy, who knows Dulari's truth and has her childhood photo comes to Prem's house. They all realize, Dulari is daughter of friend of Prem's friend,  another businessman. Dulari is reunited with her family and she and Prem get the blessings of their elders, including Prem's father.

Cast 

Madhubala as Shobha / Dulari
Suresh as Prem G. Shankar
Shyam Kumar as Jaggu
Geeta Bali as Kasturi
Jayant as Girija Shankar
Pratima Devi as Kamini G. Shankar
Amar
Nawab

Soundtrack 
The music of Dulari was composed by Naushad and lyrics were written by Shakeel Badayuni.

Release 
Theatrically released on 18 November 1949, Dulari got mostly mixed reviews from critics. Nevertheless, the film emerged as the eight highest-grossing Indian film of 1949. It grossed ₹0.7 crore, including a nett of ₹0.4 crore to become a major commercial success. According to writer Raju Bharatan, the film was continuously shown in theatres for over 35 weeks, which subsequently turned it into a silver jubilee hit. Trade journalists credited the film's immense popularity to Madhubala's stardom and Naushad's music.

References

Sources

External links 
 

1949 films
Films directed by A. R. Kardar
Hindi films remade in other languages